The Turner Prize is an annual prize presented to a British visual artist, organised by the Tate Gallery.   Named after the painter J. M. W. Turner, it was first presented in 1984, and is one of the United Kingdom's most prestigious, but controversial, art awards. Initially, the prize was awarded to the individual who had "made the greatest contribution to art in Britain in the previous twelve months", but it now celebrates "a British artist under fifty for an outstanding exhibition or other presentation of their work in the twelve months preceding". The winner is chosen by a panel of four independent judges invited by the Tate and chaired by the director of Tate Britain.  The prize is accompanied by a monetary award of £25,000, although the amount has varied depending on the sponsor.  For example, between 2004 and 2007, while sponsored by Gordon's, the total prize fund was £40,000; £25,000 was awarded to the winner and £5,000 to the losing nominees.

A shortlist of finalists is drawn up and usually published about six months before the prize is awarded in November or December each year, although shortlists were not made public in 1988 and 1990; in 1989, a list of seven "commended" artists was published. Controversy surrounded the presentation of the inaugural prize to Malcolm Morley as some critics "questioned his relevance" to art in Britain; he had lived and worked in the United States for the previous 20 years. Since its inception, the prize itself has received considerable criticism. In 2002, after Culture Minister Kim Howells described the Turner Prize as "conceptual bullshit", Prince Charles wrote a letter of support to him, stating "It has contaminated the art establishment for so long". Since 2000, the Stuckists art group have protested against the prize; in 2008, they gave out leaflets with the message "The Turner Prize is Crap", to protest at the lack of figurative paintings amongst the nominees' exhibitions.

Considerable media pressure is applied to nominees and winners of the Turner Prize.  The 2003 winner Grayson Perry stated that "Such media storms can be traumatising for someone who has laboured away for years in a studio, making art not news." Some artists, including Sarah Lucas and Julian Opie, have decided not to participate in the event, regarding a nomination as "a poisoned chalice". Stephen Deuchar, Director of Tate Britain suggested "We want the artists to be comfortable with media pressure. We have to shield them".

Several winners of the prize have won other notable awards such as the Venice Biennale, and continue to present their works at various international exhibitions. Winners' reactions to the award range from Damien Hirst's "A media circus to raise money for the Tate and Channel 4" to Jeremy Deller's "It blew me away, people's hunger to see what I'd done". Auction prices for works by previous winners have generally increased. The award has also seen some unexpected results:  Tracey Emin's My Bed, was overlooked in 1999 despite drawing large crowds to the Tate. The Chapman brothers and Willie Doherty lost out to Grayson Perry in 2003 – Perry accepted the award dressed as a girl while Jake Chapman described "losing the Turner prize to a grown man dressed as a small girl" as his "most embarrassing moment".

Winners and shortlisted artists

References
General

Specific

External links

 
Lists of British award winners